BigMachines, now Oracle Configure, Price, Quote (CPQ), was a software company founded in 2000 by Godard Abel and Christopher Shutts, which was acquired by Oracle in 2013. The software is designed to integrate with enterprise resource planning (ERP), customer relationship management (CRM), and other business systems to help companies automate the sales process. It specializes in software for configure, price and quote (CPQ). It can be used by internal teams, channel partners, VARs, distributors, customers, and outside representatives and partners. 

The company was headquartered in Deerfield, Illinois, US with development offices in San Mateo, California, US and Hyderabad, India.

Oracle acquisition
Vista Equity Partners, a private equity firm based in San Francisco, acquired majority ownership of BigMachines in 2010 through several transactions starting January 2001. Shortly after in 2011, Abel left the company.

Three years later, Oracle Corporation announced it was acquiring BigMachines on October 24, 2013. Oracle kept the product, now called CPQ Cloud.

Oracle CPQ as part of Oracle Sales 
Oracle CPQ is part of Oracle Sales, a SaaS CRM product that is part of Oracle Advertising and Customer Experience. Oracle Sales capabilities include:

 Sales force automation
 Sales planning and forecasting
 Customer data intelligence
 Sales performance management
 Subscription management
 Partner relationship management
 Configure, price, quote
In 2017, Order Management, part of the Oracle Cloud SCM, was integrated with the CPQ Cloud, giving companies the ability to use the SCM Configurator within CPQ.

Awards 

 2002 Forbes.com –  Best of the Web Winner
2003 Start Magazine –  Technology & Business Award
2004, 2006, 2007 Supply & Demand Chain – Supply & Demand Chain Executive Top 100
2005, 2007 Manufacturing Business Technology – Top 40 Emerging Software Venders
2008, 2009, 2010, 2011, 2012 Inc 5000 five-year consecutive Award Winner

2009, 2010 JMP Hot 100 Software Companies –  Best Privately Owned Software Companies
2010 Sales 2.0 Awards – Best Sales Enablement Program
2010 Codie award Winner – Best Business Productivity Solution

References

External links 

Companies based in Deerfield, Illinois
Software companies based in Illinois
Customer relationship management software companies
Customer relationship management software
Software companies established in 2000
Cloud applications
Oracle acquisitions
2013 mergers and acquisitions
Defunct software companies of the United States
2000 establishments in the United States
2000 establishments in Illinois
Companies established in 2000